Leila Anderson (born 1984) is a South African performance artist whose work balances the theatrical, the visual, and the performative. Her ongoing collaboration with Dutch artist Stan Wannet has produced several live installation works over the last two years. She is a part-time lecturer in contemporary performance at the University of Cape Town.

Career

Performances & Exhibitions
2012
 Infecting the City
 The Diagnosis - i.c.w. Stan Wannet - Shop 4 Allianz House, Infecting the City Public Arts Festival
 Afrika Lag [Deel 2] - i.c.w. Stan Wannet - On the Edge of Wrong Festival, Commune 1  
2011
 Who knows what it is this mysterious substance that everyone seems to be so
worried about identifying - i.c.w. Stan Wannet - Stedelijk Museum 's-Hertogenbosch
 Who knows what it is… - i.c.w. Stan Wannet - research and development phase on residency at Beijing
Art Lab
 EXOTIC ALIEN – photographic series created with Guy De Lancey
 EXOTIC ALIEN - solo performance in On the Edge of Wrong Festival

2010
 Foreign Affair: Trotsky –  i.c.w Rodney Place - solo multi-media performance, X-op Helsinki and at the Kunstmuseum Bonn
 Foreign Affair: Trotsky – i.c.w. Rodney Place - solo performance with print exhibition, Resolution Gallery
 Imperfections – co-director, designer & performer, Infecting the City, Spier Public Arts Festival
 Inkosazana – director, writer & designer, Out the Box Festival

2009
 Inkosazana– director, writer & designer, premiered on the Edinburgh Fringe
 Wrecked – director, co-designer, performed on the Edinburgh Fringe
 Out of the eater came forth meat/ Out of the strong came forth sweet – with the erf [81] cultural collective, FNB Dance Umbrella
" Dinner for Three – actor, co-writer

2008
 Suckle- director, writer & designer, Out the Box Festival
 we are too many - solo performance i.c.w. Peter Van Heerden - erf [81] cultural collective, Spier Contemporary

2007
 Shlof shoyn, mayn Kind - director, performer, Fresh II - National Arts Festival
 'Publication: Leila Anderson, ‘Obsession and the other: A critique of the influence of the Japanese aesthetic in the work of Geoffrey Hyland’, South African Theatre Journal SATJ 20 (2006)

Notable Works

 The Diagnosis

Live installation and performance, as part of the 2012 Infecting the City festival in Cape Town

 Who knows what it is, this mysterious substance that everyone seems to be so worried about identifying

Installation and performance i.c.w. Stan Wannet, Stedelijk Museum 's-Hertogenbosch.

 Foreign Affair: Trotsky

Live performance, video, Johannesburg, 16 minutes, 2010 i.c.w. Rodney Place

 Inkosazana

Performance, Edinburgh Fringe, 60 minutes, 2009

References

External links
 Artist website
 The Diagnosis,'' Infecting the City: http://www.infectingthecity.com/2012/festival-programme/artworks/the_diagnosis
 Artist site Stan Wannet: http://www.stanwannet.com/

1984 births
Living people
South African artists